UnLtd South Africa is a nonprofit organisation that identifies and supports social entrepreneurs in South Africa. The organisation makes awards of financial and non-financial support to social entrepreneurs, appropriate to their stage of development.

History
UnLtd South Africa was founded by Heather Brandon and Kathy Watters based on the successful model of UnLtd in the United Kingdom.

References

Social entrepreneurship
Non-profit organisations based in South Africa